Haemagogus soperi is a species of mosquito found in the coastal plain region of Ecuador. The specific epithet honors Dr. Frederick Lowe Soper.


Bionomics

H. soperi is known from the Pacific coastal lowlands of all five provinces of Ecuador; the type specimen was collected in Los Ríos Province, Ecuador.

Immatures develop in broken or cut bamboo internodes and have also been collected from leaf axils and bamboo stumps.

Medical importance

H. soperi is said to readily attack humans and is suspected to be involved in the yellow fever transmission cycle in the endemic regions of the western jungles of Ecuador.

References

Insects described in 1955
Insect vectors of human pathogens
Yellow fever
Aedini